Mandy Haggith is an author, poet, and environmental activist. She is the coordinator of Environmental Paper Network International, and was a founding director of Top Left Corner, a community arts organisation. She is currently a director of the Assynt Foundation.

Education
Mandy Haggith has a master's degree in creative writing (with distinction) from Glasgow University. Her doctoral research concerned points of disagreement, such as in environmental issues.

Since 1999 she has lived on a coastal wooded croft in Assynt, in the northwest highlands of Scotland.

Bibliography
Novels
The Last Bear (2008)
Bear Witness (2013)

The Stone Stories trilogy
The Walrus Mutterer (2018)
The Amber Seeker (2019)
The Lyre Dancers (2020)

Poetry
letting light in (2005)
Castings (2007)
A-B Tree (2016)
Into the forest (editor) (2013)
Non-fiction
Paper Trails (2008)

References

Writers from Northumberland
British women activists
English environmentalists
21st-century English women writers
English women novelists
English women poets
Year of birth missing (living people)
Living people
Alumni of the University of Glasgow